Stomopteryx splendens is a moth of the family Gelechiidae. It was described by Staudinger in 1881. It is found in Asia Minor.

References

Moths described in 1881
Stomopteryx